Son Ders ("The Last Lesson") is a 2008 Turkish comedy film directed by Mustafa Uğur Yağcıoğlu and Iraz Okumuş. Saffet Ercan, a university lecturer, returns to his Turkish homeland to continue his career. His students learn details of his secret past.

Cast 
 Ferhan Şensoy - Hakan Aymaz / Saffet Ercan
 Ece Uslu - Soley
 Kaan Urgancıoğlu - Ulaş
  - Cem
 Ekin Türkmen - Deren
 Ege Aydan - Caner

References

External links 

2008 comedy-drama films
2008 films
Turkish comedy-drama films
2008 comedy films
2008 drama films